Mike Cope (born May 8, 1962) is a retired American stock car racing driver. A two-time champion of the NASCAR Slim Jim All Pro Series, he also competed in the NASCAR Busch Series and NASCAR Craftsman Truck Series. He is no relation to Daytona 500 winner Derrike Cope.

Early career 
Mike began his NASCAR career in 1989, competing in the Slim Jim All Pro Series, a regional touring series centered on the southeastern United States. He won two series championships, in 1994 and 1996, as well as being voted Most Popular Driver three times. In addition he won the prestigious Winchester 400 three years in a row, from 1993 to 1995.

NASCAR touring series 
Cope made his debut at the major-league NASCAR level in 1996 in the Busch Series at the Milwaukee Mile. Driving the No. 58 he finished 25th, three laps down. In 1997 he attempted to move full-time to the Craftsman Truck Series, driving the No. 15 for Billy Ballew Motorsports. His first race was at Homestead-Miami Speedway, where he finished 22nd. He ran in five other races over the course of the year before being released from his contract, with a best finish of 12th at New Hampshire International Speedway.

In 1998 he attempted to move full-time to the Busch Series, driving the No. 30 for Team 34. Running in 17 races, his best finish was 7th at Hickory Speedway, however inconsistent performance led him to be released by the team following the series' race at Myrtle Beach Speedway, being replaced in the No. 30 by Todd Bodine.

Cope ran a single race in the Craftsman Truck Series in 1999, at Las Vegas Motor Speedway where he finished 14th, before once more attempting the full series schedule in 2000 for Impact Motorsports in the No. 86, with sponsorship from R.C. Cola. Despite the team having had good performance the previous year with Stacy Compton driving, Cope struggled, posting a best finish of 12th in six races with the team, that coming in the first race of the season at Daytona International Speedway. At the seventh race of the season, at Gateway International Raceway, Cope did not accompany the team to the track; he was subsequently released, being replaced in the No. 86 by Scott Riggs.

Post-NASCAR career
Following his departure from Impact Motorsports Cope moved to the American Speed Association, starting his own race team in Hudson, Florida and running the No. 25 Chevrolet with sponsorship from Manheim Auto Auctions. He ran in the series, building and driving his own cars, through 2005 when he retired, planning to focus on the racing career of his son, Travis Cope as driver, competing in Super Late Model events. Mike cope racing presently fields 5 cars in SCCA pro Trans am 2 road racing with multiple wins and pole awards. And in 2013 Mike Cope became an authorized chassis builder for the TA2 series.

Track Owner

Motorsports career results

Busch Series

References

External links 
 
 

Living people
1962 births
People from Pinellas Park, Florida
Sportspeople from the Tampa Bay area
Racing drivers from Florida
NASCAR drivers
American Speed Association drivers